Dave Canales (born May 7, 1981) is an American football coach who is the offensive coordinator for the Tampa Bay Buccaneers of the National Football League (NFL). He was also an assistant coach for the Seattle Seahawks from 2010 to 2022.

Early life and playing career
A native of Harbor City, California, Canales attended Carson High School in Carson, California, where he played wide receiver and defensive back. He played college football at Azusa Pacific University, then a NAIA program in Azusa, California. In his college career, Canales recorded 27 receptions for 293 yards and one touchdown. He graduated in 2002 from Azusa Pacific with a degree in business administration.

Coaching career
Canales began his coaching career serving as the head coach and offensive coordinator of the freshman/sophomore team at his alma mater, Carson High School from 2004-2005.

College

El Camino College
Canales made the jump to college coaching in 2006 - joining El Camino (Calif.) College, where he served as tight ends coach and special teams coordinator in his first year, before transitioning to quarterbacks coach in his final season (2007-2008). During his tenure, the school won the California Community College State Championship in 2006 and also secured two Mission Conference titles.

USC
During his time at El Camino College, Canales formed a relationship with Pete Carroll, the head coach of the USC Trojans. In 2009, Canales joined Carroll at USC, where he served as an assistant strength coach for one season.

National Football League

Seattle Seahawks
In 2010, Canales followed Carroll after the latter's acceptance of the Seattle Seahawks' head coaching position. He won his first Super Bowl title when the Seahawks defeated the Denver Broncos in Super Bowl XLVIII. Canales spent 13 years with the Seahawks, serving in a variety of capacities on the offensive side of the staff. From 2010 through 2017, Canales served as wide receivers coach, before taking on the roles of quarterbacks coach and passing game coordinator from 2018 through 2022. Canales was credited with assisting in the resurgence of quarterback Geno Smith's career. In the 2022 season, Smith was highly effective as the team's starting quarterback and was named NFL Comeback Player of the Year, while also earning his first Pro Bowl appearance.

Tampa Bay Buccaneers
On February 16, 2023, Canales was hired by the Tampa Bay Buccaneers as their offensive coordinator under head coach Todd Bowles.

References

External links
 Tampa Bay Buccaneers bio

1981 births
Living people
American football defensive backs
American football wide receivers
Azusa Pacific Cougars football players
Seattle Seahawks coaches
USC Trojans football coaches
High school football coaches in California
Junior college football coaches in the United States
People from Carson, California
Sports coaches from Los Angeles
Players of American football from Los Angeles
Tampa Bay Buccaneers players